Thaddaeus Washington (born November 10, 1983, in New Orleans, Louisiana) is a gridiron football linebacker for the Edmonton Eskimos of the Canadian Football League. He was originally signed by the Buffalo Bills as an undrafted free agent in 2007. He played college football at Colorado.

Professional career
Washington signed with the Edmonton Eskimos in March 2008.

References

1983 births
Living people
Players of American football from New Orleans
Players of Canadian football from New Orleans
American football linebackers
Colorado Buffaloes football players
Buffalo Bills players
Edmonton Elks players